Mesogenea is a genus of moths of the family Erebidae. The genus was erected by George Hampson in 1902.

Species
Some species of this genus are:
Mesogenea costimacula Hampson, 1926
Mesogenea excavata Hampson, 1926
Mesogenea persinuosa Hampson, 1910
Mesogenea varians Hampson, 1902

References

Hampson, G. F. (1902). "The moths of South Africa (Part II)". Annals of the South African Museum 2: 255–446.

Calpinae